Beach Volleyball at the 2014 Summer Youth Olympics was held from August 17 to August 27. This was the first time beach volleyball was held at the Youth Olympics with indoor volleyball appearing at the 2010 edition. The events took place at the Nanjing Olympic Sports Center in Nanjing, China.

Qualification

A total of 36 teams participated in each gender category. Each National Olympic Committee (NOC) could enter a maximum of 2 teams of 2 athletes, 1 per each gender. As hosts, China was initially given the maximum quota, but only field a girls' team. A further 10 teams, 5 in each gender was to be decided by the Tripartite Commission, but only 5 were given. The other spots were reallocated to the top ranked teams not yet qualified. Each of the five volleyball federations hosted qualification events to qualify 12 teams, 6 in each gender.

Africa and Asia hosted a single qualification tournament while Europe created a Youth Continental Cup with different zonal stages ending with a final qualification tournament. South America created a six legged tour, though only five events were held where the six countries with the most points qualified and North, Central America and Caribbean hosted four zonal tournaments where the winners qualified to the Youth Olympics and a final tournament where the top two nations qualified.

Only athletes born between 1 January 1996 and 31 December 1999 were eligible to participate in the 2014 Youth Olympics.

Boys

Girls

Schedule

The schedule was released by the Nanjing Youth Olympic Games Organizing Committee. During the group stage there will be three sessions per day in order for all teams to play their match. Likewise the quarterfinals will have two sessions in order for all teams to play on the two main courts.

All times are CST (UTC+8)

Medal summary

Medal table

Events

References

External links
Official Results Book – Beach volleyball

 
2014 Summer Youth Olympics events
Youth Summer Olympics
International volleyball competitions hosted by China
Beach volleyball at the Youth Olympics